Mamyr Basam Stash (born 4 May 1993) is a Russian racing cyclist, who rides for Russian amateur team .

Major results

2012
 9th Overall Baltic Chain Tour
2013
 1st Stage 5 Grand Prix of Adygeya
2014
 1st Central European Tour Szerencs–Ibrány
 Tour of Kavkaz
1st  Points classification
1st Stages 1 & 3
 5th Central European Tour Budapest GP
2015
 2nd  Road race, UEC European Under-23 Road Championships
 4th Overall ZLM Tour
 4th Grand Prix of Moscow
 5th Memorial Grundmanna I Wizowskiego
 6th Overall Baltic Chain Tour
2016
 2nd Trofej Umag
 4th Overall Baltic Chain Tour
 8th Handzame Classic
2017
 1st Stage 4 Flèche du Sud
2018
 1st Stage 3 Course de Solidarność et des Champions Olympiques
 10th Clássica da Arrábida
2019
 1st Stage 3b (TTT) Vuelta Ciclista a Costa Rica
2020
 1st Grand Prix Gazipaşa
 5th Grand Prix Central Anatolia
 6th GP Antalya
 6th Grand Prix Velo Erciyes
 7th Grand Prix Manavgat–Side
 8th Grand Prix Develi
 9th Grand Prix Cappadocia
2021
 2nd Grand Prix Gazipaşa
 5th GP Mediterranean
 8th Grand Prix Velo Manavgat
2022
 1st Grand Prix Velo Manavgat
 3rd Road race, National Road Championships
 7th Grand Prix Gazipaşa

References

External links
 
 

1993 births
Living people
Russian male cyclists
People from Maykop
Sportspeople from Adygea